Eupithecia subbrunneata is a moth in the family Geometridae. It is found in China and Russia (Siberia and the Russian Far East).

References

Moths described in 1904
subbrunneata
Moths of Asia